Gregorio Vargas Hernández, better known as Goyo Vargas (born 27 October 1970) is a Mexican retired professional boxer who held the WBC featherweight title in 1993.

Professional career
Vargas was born in Santa María Natívitas, a small community located in the municipality of Cuautepec, Hidalgo, into a family of boxing aficionados. He was trained by his father since childhood and two brothers, Adán and Efraín, also became professional pugilists.

On 28 April 1993, Vargas won the WBC featherweight title from Paul Hodkinson by TKO in round 7. On 11 July 1998. He would lose the title in his first defense to New yorker Kevin Kelley. Vargas would get another opportunity at a world title in his next fight, this time losing a unanimous decision to John John Molina.

Vargas retired in 2005.

Professional boxing record

See also
List of Mexican boxing world champions
List of world featherweight boxing champions

References

External links

 

1970 births
Living people
Mexican male boxers
Boxers from Hidalgo (state)
World featherweight boxing champions
World Boxing Council champions
Super-featherweight boxers
Lightweight boxers